In mathematics, the infinitesimal character of an irreducible representation ρ of a semisimple Lie group G on a vector space V is, roughly speaking, a mapping to scalars that encodes the process of first differentiating and then diagonalizing the representation. It therefore is a way of extracting something essential from the representation ρ by two successive linearizations.

Formulation

The infinitesimal character is the linear form on the center Z of the universal enveloping algebra of the Lie algebra of G that the representation induces. This construction relies on some extended version of Schur's lemma to show that any z in Z acts on V as a scalar, which by abuse of notation could be written ρ(z).

In more classical language, z is a differential operator, constructed from the infinitesimal transformations which are induced on V by the Lie algebra of G. The effect of Schur's lemma is to force all v in V to be simultaneous eigenvectors of z acting on V. Calling the corresponding eigenvalue

λ = λ(z),

the infinitesimal character is by definition the mapping

z → λ(z).

There is scope for further formulation. By the Harish-Chandra isomorphism, the center Z can be identified with the subalgebra of elements of  the symmetric algebra of the Cartan subalgebra a that are invariant under the Weyl group, so an infinitesimal character can be identified with an element of

a*⊗ C/W,

the orbits under the Weyl group W of the space a*⊗ C of complex linear functions on the Cartan subalgebra.

See also
 Harish-Chandra isomorphism

Representation theory of Lie groups